Joseph Tate is an American attorney.

Joseph Tate may also refer to:

Joe Tate (Emmerdale), character in British soap opera
Joe Tate (footballer) (1904–1973), English footballer
Joe Tate (politician), American politician from Michigan

See also
Joseph Tait (disambiguation)